St. Xavier's Senior Secondary Co-Ed School is a co-ed school in Bhopal, Madhya Pradesh. It is affiliated to Central Board of Secondary Education and is located in the Barkheda area in Bhopal. The school is managed by the Archdiocese of Bhopal, under the Chairmanship of the Archbishop Rev. Dr. Leo Cornelio.

History 
St. Xavier's School is named after St. Francis Xavier, who is regarded as the Patron Saint of the School. It was founded in the year 1982, by the- then Archbishop of Bhopal Archdiocese, Late Dr. Eugene D'Souza. The school was initially a boys' school (called St. Xavier's Boys High School), but in 1992, it became a Co-Educational institute, under Late Father Samuel Kavil's leadership.

The school was part of the Board of Education, Madhya Pradesh. It was then affiliated with the C.B.S.E. in 1998.

Infrastructure and facilities 
St. Xavier's School's campus is situated in Berkheda, Bhopal. The campus consists of classrooms, laboratories, a general assembly area with a full-sized stage, an auditorium, a sports arena, staff and student parking areas, the office and the main gate. The school has numerous laboratories to help students in their learning experience. The school's library contains over 2000 books and electronic media. The school has an Infirmary providing medical assistance and a Counselling Service to help and guide students.

Apart from academics, the school also provides a number of co-curricular and extra-curricular activities. The school has N.C.C. Cadets to inculcate a feeling of patriotism in the students.

Houses and the cabinet 
A House-System is present in the school to impart competitiveness in the students. The student body is divided into 4 houses, signified by 4 colors:
 Red House - Motto: 'Love is the synonym of Sacrifice'
 Green House - Motto: 'We believe in Development'
 Blue House - Motto: 'Sky is the Limit'
 Yellow House - Motto: 'We are the rising Sun'
Each house is led by a House Captain and a Vice Captain, chosen from among the students via an annual school cabinet selection procedure, which is primarily based on the student's overall performance in the preceding years. The cabinet as a whole is led by The Head-Boy and The Head-Girl, along with Cultural, Discipline and Sports Ministers.

Staff and management 

A staff of around 200 members consists of teachers specialising in senior and junior subjects, sports, office activities, and medical skills. The school also facilitates in the additional training for the staff members. Regular Parent-Teacher meetings are held to update the parents on student's progress and provide feedback.

Other activities 
St. Xavier's School hosts a variety of annual event for the parents & the students. These events include the Annual Day Functions, Sports Days, Science/Arts Exhibitions & School Fetes. The school also has an active alumni group, St. Xavier's Alumni Welfare Association (SAWA), who regularly organise reunions.

External links 
 Official Website

References 

Schools in Bhopal
1982 establishments in Madhya Pradesh
Educational institutions established in 1982
Catholic schools in India
Christian schools in Madhya Pradesh